Daniele Cortis is an 1885 novel by the Italian writer Antonio Fogazzaro. The plot follows the impossible love between Daniele Cortis, an idealistic Catholic politician, and his cousin Elena, married to a man who does not understand her.

Film adaptation
In 1947 the novel was turned into a film Daniele Cortis directed by Mario Soldati and starring Vittorio Gassman and Sarah Churchill.

References

Bibliography
 Brand, Peter & Pertile, Lino. The Cambridge History of Italian Literature. Cambridge University Press, 1999.

1885 novels
19th-century Italian novels
Novels set in Italy
Novels by Antonio Fogazzaro
Italian novels adapted into films